Zaine Griff (born 4 October 1957 in Auckland, New Zealand) is a singer-songwriter who was part of the English new wave and new romantics scene of the early 1980s. Raised in New Zealand, he moved to England in the 1970s, where he continued with his artistic and musical career, becoming a solo artist. He worked with Lindsay Kemp, in arts, and The Human Instinct, The Kinks, David Bowie, Kate Bush, Gary Numan and Hans Zimmer, in music.

Biography
Brought up in New Zealand and Tahiti by his Danish parents, Griff learned to play guitar at an early age.

Aged 16, he joined rock band The Human Instinct as their bassist, taking the stage name of Glenn Mikkelson. During his time with the band, they recorded two albums: The Hustler (1974) and Peg Leg – which was recorded in 1975 but not released until 2002. Despite his youth, Griff (now known as Mikkelson) wrote seven songs for these albums and was lead vocalist on five.

In 1975, he left The Human Instinct and moved to London, England, to continue his musical career. There he became the vocalist and bassist of a band called Baby Face and began studying mime and movement alongside Kate Bush, Adam Darius and Lindsay Kemp. At the time, he joined Kemp's production of Flowers, a play written by Jean Genet, but quit when the company went on tour to Australia, as he wanted to stay in London to continue with music.

After leaving the Kemp company, Griff joined a band called Screemer, with whom he released two singles: "Interplanetary Twist", in 1976, and "In The City", in 1977. Griff also played bass guitar with The Kinks on their album, Misfits.

In 1979 Griff started his solo career, using various musicians for his band, including future film music composer Hans Zimmer, and Ultravox drummer Warren Cann. He released two albums, Ashes and Diamonds (recorded in 1979, released in 1980) and Figvres (1982). 
Ashes and Diamonds was produced by Tony Visconti. On both albums, Zimmer played keyboards and worked the computers. On the album Figvres, Zimmer's influence was more present in the musical arrangements of the songs. For Zimmer, the album "Figvres" was an inspiration for his later work in making soundtracks for films. Zimmer is now a well-known film music composer, who made soundtracks for over 150 well-known films.

During the sessions for his first solo-album Griff worked with David Bowie. As recalled by Griff himself – in an April 2013 interview on New Zealand radio – producer Tony Visconti had just returned from working with David Bowie in Berlin, when they started to record Griff's album in autumn 1979. During the sessions Bowie walked in, saw Griff recording and asked him and his band to record three new versions of his songs. One of them was the acoustic "Space Oddity" (1979 version), the other one a totally different version of "Panic in Detroit" which was later added to Bowie's next album Scary Monsters (And Super Creeps) (and years later again to Heathen). Tony Visconti has confirmed he brought Bowie and Griff together in the studio. The songs were also produced by Tony Visconti and intended for use in a New Year's Eve TV-show in 1979. In the end, only the new (acoustic) "Space Oddity" was broadcast and also released as B-side of the maxi-single "Moon of Alabama". The meeting of Bowie and Griff is also described in David Bowie: An Illustrated Record by Roy Carr and Charles Shaar Murray. In the book Bowie is quoted, telling he was amazed to see the resemblance between him and Griff when they first met.

On the second album Figvres,  Kate Bush sang backing vocals for the song "Flowers", which was dedicated to the pair's mime and dance teacher Lindsay Kemp. Also, Yukihiro Takahashi, of Japanese electronic band YMO, joined the musicians. The single "Tonight" peaked at No. 54 in the UK Singles Chart in February 1980, whilst "Ashes and Diamonds" reached No. 68 in the same listing in June that year.

In 1982, Griff had an art exhibition in Ebury Gallery, London, to which the London artist Mark Wardel also contributed work, inspired by Griff's music. In 1983 Griff was involved in Hans Zimmer and Warren Cann's Helden Project. Griff sang on six of the songs on the recorded album Spies. The album, however, was never released. Only the single "Holding On" – a duet of Griff and singer Linda Allan – was released on ZiCa Records.

In 1984, Griff returned to New Zealand, where he became the owner of a jazz club in Auckland. He has produced several artists and has written newer songs in more recent times. In January 2010, Griff started to record his third album Child Who Wants The Moon, which was released in August 2011. Griff's first two albums Ashes and Diamonds and Figvres were re-released both on CD and on iTunes in June 2012. In November 2012 they were released in a special Japanese release with bonus songs.

In 2011 Griff returned to live music. After a series of live concerts in his homeland New Zealand, he returned to the London stage in October 2012, when he was a guest in Toyah's live show "Resurrection" in O2 Islington. In September 2014, Griff did two live concerts in Tokyo, Japan.
In 2016 Zaine Griff joined the New Zealand tribute concerts ‘David Bowie is waiting in the sky’ with a large group of New Zealand artists. He sang several Bowie songs, among them “Let’s Dance” and “Golden Years” - video’s of which can be seen on YouTube. In 2018 Zaine performed live at The Water Rats in London for a select group of fans.  Tony Visconti, who produced many Bowie albums and also Zaine Griff’s first solo-album, joined Zaine on stage to play bass on the song “The Scandinavian”. Visconti had also done that during the recording of the album ‘’Ashes And Diamonds’’ in 1979.

In April 2013, Griff released his fourth album The Visitor in Auckland, produced by Eddie Rayner of Split Enz. Later that year, Griff found a box of old studio demo recordings he thought were long lost. They were recorded in London between 1978 and 1983, and consisted of three early versions of songs he re-recorded years later for his album Figvres. There were also nine songs which were unknown until they were released. In an Auckland studio, he had the tapes repaired and the demos remastered before he released them as his fifth album Immersed in May 2014. In January 2016 Griff released his sixth solo album Mood Swings, which has a more European sound that reminds his early eighties albums, according to Zaine Griff’s own comments on the album.

A new and special rerelease of Zaine Griff's early albums Ashes and Diamonds and Figvres was released in August 2017 on a 2CD pack in MIG Records Collectors Premium Series. It's a very special release as beside the remastered albums it consists 21 mostly unknown and unreleased demo's, rare songs and outtakes.

In 2020 Zaine Griff was asked to be frontman for the “Visage 1980 x 2020” concerts in England and Belgium, organised by Rusty Egan around the 40 years anniversary of Visage. Due to the corona pandemic the concerts were cancelled. They’re scheduled again for 2021, but it’s not certain whether the situation around the Covid-measures will be improved in time.

In 2021 the first song in a series of coöperations between Zaine Griff and Chris Payne (Tubeway Army, Visage) was released: Trip, Stumble and Fall. The songs are to ‘describe the breakdown of relationships in different stages of your life’. An album with these songs is almost completed and expected to be released in 2023. 

Zaine had never forgotten the Helden Project, he took part in with Hans Zimmer and Warren Cann in 1983. The recorded album appeared never to have been completely finished and was never released. In recent years Zaine Griff spoke to Hans Zimmer about performing Helden songs live on stage, but it did not result in a concert. Then Zaine created plans to ‘unearth’ this album and make a re-recording of the entire album. He asked Warren Cann to join the new Helden Project. Cann welcomed the idea of a remake, but did not want to join as ‘he was not active in music anymore’. Thus Zaine formed a completely new team around him to re-record the Helden Project album Spies. To stay as close to the atmosphere and sound of the original recordings as they could, they used Warren Cann’s original drum and percussion arrangements and used synthesizers and equipment from the early Eighties when the original recordings were made. The album was released 30 November 2022 and surprised many fans of Zaine Griff, Ultravox and Hans Zimmer - as this is the first time the Helden songs are released in full sound quality. 

The Helden Project // Spies album was received in a very positive way and got good reviews, speaking about ‘high quality album, giving the Helden songs the quality they deserve’ and even calling it ‘a masterpiece’.  Martyn Ware (former Human League and Heaven 17) interviewed Zaine Griff about it in his radio broadcast ‘Electronically Yours’. Dutch Radio channel Xymphonia, dedicated to progressive music, listed Zaine’s new Helden album in their list of ‘Best Albums Of 2022’.

Discography
With The Human Instinct:
The Hustler (Zodiac, 1974)
Peg Leg (recorded 1975, released 2002)

With Screemer:
Interplanetary Twist (Bell, 1976)
In The City (Arista, August 1977)

As solo artist:
Tonight – single (Automatic, February 1980)
Ashes and Diamonds – single (Automatic, May 1980)
Run – single (Automatic, August 1980)
Ashes and Diamonds – album (Automatic, October 1980, rerelease ZG Music Ltd, June 2012)
Figvres – single (Polydor, July 1982)
Flowers – single (Polydor, September 1982)
Figvres – album (Polydor, October 1982, rerelease ZG Music Ltd, June 2012)
Swing – single (Polydor, October 1983)
Child Who Wants the Moon – album (ZG Music Ltd, August 2011)
The Visitor – album (ZG Music Ltd, April 2013)
Abjure – EP, 4 songs (ZG Music Ltd, April 2013)
Immersed – album (ZG Music Ltd/Ode Records, May 2014)
Mood Swings – album (ZG Music Ltd/Ode Records, January 2016)
The Helden Project // Spies - album (Sony Music Labels SICX 30156, December 2022)

With The Helden Project, Hans Zimmer, Warren Cann and others (1983, lead vocals):
Holding On – single (1983)
Spies – album, vocals on 6 songs (unreleased)

With Yukihiro Takahashi:
This Strange Obsession on What? Me Worry? album

With Gary Numan:
The Secret on the album, Berserker (1984)

References

External links
Fahrenheit 451 Site dedicated to Zaine Griff
The5uk.com
 Official Facebook page with Zaine Griff news
 Official website of Zaine Griff Music organisation

1957 births
People from Auckland
New Zealand singer-songwriters
New Zealand bass guitarists
Male bass guitarists
Living people
New Zealand male guitarists
New Zealand guitarists